CCGS Tracy was a Marine service vessel and navigational aid tender operated by the Canadian Coast Guard. Designed for service on the Great Lakes and the Saint Lawrence River, the ship joined the fleet in 1968 and was stationed at Canadian Coast Guard Base at Sorel, Quebec and serviced the Quebec Region. The vessel was taken out of service in 2013 and was sold in 2017 to private interests.

Design and description
Tracy was a Marine service vessel and navigational aid tender operated by the Canadian Coast Guard.

The ship is powered by two Fairbanks Morse 38D8-1/8OP 8-cylinder diesel electric DC system that creates  sustained. The system powers two motors driving two shafts creating .

Tracy has a crew of 23 and has one Kelvin Hughes I-band navigational radar. She is rated as Arctic Class 2 and has an endurance of 17 days. The ship is equipped with two work boats, a RHIB and an SB barge.

Service history

CCGS Tracy was constructed in 1967–68 at Port Weller Dry Docks, Port Weller, Ontario, with the yard number 42. Christened by the wife of the Canadian Postmaster General Jean-Pierre Cote, Tracy was intended as a replacement for the older Coast Guard vessel, . The ship was completed in April 1968 and was placed in service on 17 April. The ship was named after Marquis Alexandre de Prouville de Tracy (1596–1670), a former Lieutenant General of New France. The cost for the new ship was $2.75 million.

The ship was assigned to the Laurentian region by the Canadian Coast Guard. The ship was later stationed at Canadian Coast Guard Base at Sorel, Quebec servicing the Quebec Region. A refit was performed in 1989. In 2009, the vessel underwent a $9 million refit, performed by Verreault Navigation Inc. of Quebec. The vessel was planned to be kept in service for a further ten years. However, in 2013 Tracy was taken out of service and laid up at the Coast Guard base in Prescott, Ontario. Renamed 2016-01, the vessel was put up for sale. The vessel was sold in February 2017 for $373,000 to Groupe Océan.

References

Notes

Citations

Sources
 
 
 
 

Icebreakers of the Canadian Coast Guard
Navaids tenders of the Canadian Coast Guard
Ships built in Quebec
1968 ships
Navigational aids